The Federal Public Sector Labour Relations and Employment Board (FPSLREB; , LCRTESPF) is an independent quasi-judicial tribunal that administers the collective bargaining and "grievance adjudication systems" in Canada's federal public service and in Parliament.

It formed on 1 November 2014 through the merger of the former Public Service Labour Relations Board and the former Public Service Staffing Tribunal. It resolves labour relations issues and staffing complaints among federal public servants through adjudication and mediation.

History 
The Public Service Labour Relations Board was an independent quasi-judicial statutory tribunal that reported to Parliament through the Minister of Public Services and Procurement. It was responsible for administering the collective bargaining and grievance adjudication systems in the federal public service and in Parliament. Moreover, by agreement with the Government of the Yukon, the Board also administered the collective bargaining and grievance adjudication systems under the Yukon Education Staff Relations Act and the Yukon Public Service Staff Relations Act.

In 2003, a new Public Service Labour Relations Act was passed by Parliament (S.C. 2003, c.22), coming into force on 1 April 2005. In 2014, the Board was merged with the Public Service Staffing Tribunal under the Federal Public Sector Labour Relations and Employment Board Act to form the Federal Public Sector Labour Relations and Employment Board. As such, today's Board is responsible for the duties that were previously dealt with by the former tribunals under the Public Service Labour Relations and Employment Board Act and the Public Service Employment Act, respectively.

Organization

Members 
The Board is composed of a chairperson, up to 2 vice-chairpersons, up to 12 full-time members, and additional part-time members as required. The Governor in Council appoints full-time Board members for terms of no longer than 5 years and part-time Board members for terms of up to 3 years, and may be re-appointed any number of times.

, full-time members include:

 Catherine Ebbs, Chairperson — term ending 2021 April 8
 David P. Olsen, Vice-Chairperson —  term ending 2021 April 29
 Margaret T.A. Shannon, Vice-Chairperson — term ending 2021 April 29
 Nathalie Daigle — term ending 2022 December 13
 Bryan R. Gray — term ending 2025 July 5
 Chantal Homier-Nehmé — term ending 2025 September 7
 John G. Jaworski — term ending 2022 November 5
 Steven B. Katkin — term ending 2021 April 30
 Marie-Claire Perrault — term ending 2025 July 12
 Nancy Rosenberg — term ending 2023 September 3
 James Knopp — term ending 2023 September 3
 David Orfald — term ending 2023 September 3

Legislation and clients 
Under the Federal Public Sector Labour Relations and Employment Board Act, the Board is responsible for interpreting and applying the following legislation:

 Federal Public Sector Labour Relations Act (FPSLRA) — Collective bargaining and grievance adjudication systems for the federal public sector and Parliament, as well as RCMP members and reservists.
 Public Service Employment Act (PSEA) — Complaints related to internal appointments, appointment revocations, and lay-offs in the federal public service.
 Canadian Human Rights Act — Human rights issues in grievances and complaints under FPSLRA and PSEA.
 Parliamentary Employment and Staff Relations Act — Collective bargaining and grievance adjudication for the institutions of Parliament.
 Public Sector Equitable Compensation Act — Pay equity complaints in the federal public service. This Act is to be repealed and replaced by the Pay Equity Act, which received royal assent on 13 December 2018 but is not yet in force.
 Canada Labour Code, Part II — Complaints related to workplace health and safety and reprisals in the federal public service.

The Treasury Board of Canada, employing over 180,000 public servants in 27 bargaining units, is the main employer covered by the Board's mandate. The majority (60%) of unionized federal public service employees are represented by the Public Service Alliance of Canada, while 23% are represented by the Professional Institute of the Public Service of Canada as the second-largest bargaining agent, and 17% are represented by the other 25 bargaining units.

See also
 Civil Service Act 1918

References

External links 
 Official Site

Federal departments and agencies of Canada
Canadian tribunals
Labour relations in Canada